Regional Airlines was a French regional airline headquartered at Nantes Atlantique Airport and in Bouguenais, France, near Nantes.

History
The airline was formed by the merger of Air Vendée and Airlec. On 30 March 2001 Regional Airlines, Flandre Air, and Proteus Airlines merged into Régional.

Fleet
 1 Embraer EMB-120 Brasilia
 6 Embraer EMB-120 Brasilia Advanced
 4 Embraer ERJ-135ER
 12 Embraer ERJ-145

Destinations
 International 
 Amsterdam, Barcelona, Bilbao, Copenhagen, Geneva, Lisbon, London, Madrid, Milan, Porto, Turin
 Domestic 
 Ajaccio, Angers, Angouleme, Brest, Biarritz, Bordeaux, Bourges, Clermont-Ferrand, Caen, Dijon, Basle, Le Havre, Lille, La Rochelle, Lyon, Montpellier, Marseille, Nice, Nantes, Rennes, Strasbourg, Toulon, Toulouse

See also
Cygnus Air

References

Defunct airlines of France
Airlines disestablished in 2001